Punam Suri is an Indian educator, journalist and recipient of the Padma Shri. Suri is president of the D.A.V. College Managing Committee and Chancellor of DAV University. He was formerly managing editor of The Daily Milap, an Indian newspaper.

References

Heads of universities and colleges in India
Living people
Year of birth missing (living people)
Recipients of the Padma Shri in literature & education